This is a list of castles and chateaux located in the South Moravian Region of the Czech Republic.

B

 Babice Castle
 Bítov Castle
 Blansek Castle
 Blansko Chateau
 Bohuslavice Castle
 Boleradice Castle
 Boskovice - Bašta Castle
 Boskovice - Rezidence Chateau
 Boskovice Castle
 Boskovice Chateau
 Branišovice Chateau
 Brnen Castle
 Brno - Pisárky Chateau
 Břeclav Chateau
 Břežany Chateau
 Bučín Castle
 Bučovice Castle
 Bučovice Chateau
 Bukovina Castle
 Bzenec Castle

C
 Chrlice Chateau
 Chvalkovice na Hané Chateau
 Cornštejn Castle 
 Čejkovice Chateau
 Čepička Castle
 Černá Hora Chateau

D
 Deblín Castle
 Dědice Castle
 Děvičky Castle
 Dolní Kounice Chateau
 Doubravice nad Svitavou Castle
 Drnholec Chateau
 Drnovice Chateau
 Dyje Chateau

E
 Emin zámek Chateau

F
 Ferdinandsko Chateau
 Frejštejn Castle

H
 Habrovany Chateau
 Hodonín Chateau
 Holštejn Castle
 Horákov Castle
 Horní Dunajovice Chateau
 Hostim Chateau
 Hradisko u Velkých Bílovic Castle
 Hradisko Castle
 Hraniční zámek Chateau
 Hrádek u Drnholce Castle
 Hrádek u Snovídek Castle
 Hrubšice Chateau
 Hrušovany nad Jevišovkou Chateau

I
 Ivanovice na Hané Chateau

J

 Janův Hrad Castle
 Jaroslavice Chateau
 Jevišovice Castle

K
 Kanšperk Castle
 Kepkov Castle
 Klobouky u Brna Chateau
 Kociánka Chateau
 Komorov Chateau
 Koryčany Chateau
 Kravsko Chateau
 Křetín Chateau
 Křtiny Chateau
 Kuchlov Castle
 Kunštát Chateau
 Kupařovice Chateau
 Kuřim Chateau
 Kyjov Chateau

L

 Lamberg Chateau
 Lapikus Castle
 Lechovice Chateau
 Lečenec Castle
 Lednice Chateau
 Ledvice (Vémyslice) Castle
 Lelekovice Castle
 Leopoldsruhe Chateau
 Lesní Hluboké Chateau
 Letohrádek Mitrovských Chateau
 Letovice Chateau
 Levnov Castle
 Lhota Rapotina Chateau
 Líšeň Chateau
 Lomnice Chateau
 , Louka, Blansko District
 Louka Chateau
 Lovecký zámeček Chateau
 Luleč Castle
 Lysice Chateau

M

 Medlánky Chateau
 Melice Castle
 Mikulov Castle 
 Milotice Chateau
 Miroslav Chateau
 Moravský Krumlov Chateau

N
 Nechvalín Castle
 Neuburg Chateau
 Neuhaus Castle
 Nevojice - hrádek Castle
 Nové Hvězdlice Castle
 Nové Hvězdlice Chateau
 Nové Zámky Chateau
 Nový Hrad u Adamova Castle
 Nový Hrádek Castle

O
 Obřany Castle
 Olomučany Castle
 Orlov Castle
 Osiky Castle
 Oslavany Chateau

P
 Plaveč Chateau
 Pohansko Chateau
 Pouzdřany Chateau
 Pulkov Castle
 Pustiměř Castle

R

 Račice u Brna Chateau
 Randez-vous Chateau
 Rájec nad Svitavou Chateau
 Rešice Chateau
 Ronov Castle
 Rosice Chateau
 Rumberk Castle
 Rybniční zámeček Chateau
 Rychvald Castle
 Rytířská jeskyně Castle
 Řečkovice Chateau
 Říčany Castle

S

 Sedlec Chateau
 Sirotčí hrádek Castle
 Slavkov Chateau
 Smilův hrad Castle
 Sobůlky, hrádek v poloze Valy Castle
 Sokolnice Chateau
 Stagnov Castle
 Starý Plumlov Castle
 Strážnice - zámek Chateau
 Svitávka Castle
 Šardice Chateau
 Šebetov Chateau
 Šenkenberk Castle
 Šitbořice Castle
 Šlapanice Chateau
 Špilberk Castle
 Švábenice Castle

T
 Tavíkovice Chateau
 Templštejn Castle
 Těšany Chateau
 Trmačov Castle
 Troyerstein Chateau
 Tulešice Chateau
 Tvořihráz Chateau

U
 Uherčice Chateau
 Uherský Ostroh Castle
 Újezd u Ždánic Castle
 Újezd Chateau

V

 Valtice Chateau
 Velké Opatovice Chateau
 Velké Pavlovice Chateau
 Veselí nad Moravou Chateau
 Veveří Castle
 Věteřov Castle
 Vildenberk Castle
 Vícov Castle
 Vítovice Castle
 Vlasatice Chateau
 Vohančice Chateau
 Vranov nad Dyjí Chateau
 Vyškov na Moravě Chateau

Z
 Zbraslav Castle
 Znojmo Castle
 Ždánice - Palánek Castle
 Ždánice Chateau

See also
 List of castles in the Czech Republic
 List of castles in Europe
 List of castles

External links
 Castles, Chateaux, and Ruins 
 Czech Republic - Manors, Castles, Historical Towns
 Hrady.cz 

Castles in the South Moravian Region
South Moravia